Teledildonics (also known as cyberdildonics) is the name coined for virtual sex encounters using networked, electronic sex toys to mimic and extend human sexual interaction.  The term became known after technology critic and writer Howard Rheingold used it in his 1991 book Virtual Reality. In the publication, Rheingold made futuristic conclusions and summaries surrounding technology and used the term 'teledildonics' to refer to remote sexual activity using technology. Nowadays, the term is commonly used to describe remote sex  (or, at least, remote mutual masturbation), where tactile sensations are communicated over a remote cloud between the participants. The term can also refer to the integration of telepresence with sexual activity that these interfaces make possible and can be used in conjunction or interchangeably with sex-technology. The term has also been used less accurately (since there's no "tele-" element) to refer to robotic sex, i.e., computer-controlled sex toys that aim to substitute for or improve upon sex with a human partner. Nowadays, it is commonly used to refer to Bluetooth-enabled sex toys.

Background
Teledildonics is commonly used to describe Bluetooth-enabled sex toys, many of which have entered the market in the last decade. As well as being open to a remote connection for control, some toys can also be connected with corresponding devices to deliver synchronized movements between couples and remote partners. Teledildonics have also been used within the adult industry to create 'immersive' webcam shows, whereby users control the vibrations of the webcammers sex toy. Some media outlets have reported on 'teldildonic' technology used by long-distance couples in order to maintain sexual relations.

As well as offering remote functions, many teledildonic toys can be synchronized with pornography movies. Synchronization of porn with teledildonic or Bluetooth toys actions are controlled by means of a previously-written script. A report in 2008 suggested that teledildonics, along with text and email and webcams, can be used to "wind each other up to fever pitch during the working day" as a prelude to sex with a human during the evening hours. New technologies can help people establish "emotional connections" via the web. Indeed, teledildonics technology has already been integrated with adult online webcam services and certain sex toys, such as OhMiBod, Lovense and We-Vibe. One Dutch manufacturer, KIIROO, offers a two-way connection between both female and male sex toys.

History 
The term was coined as early as 1975 by Ted Nelson in his book Computer Lib/Dream Machines. The idea of virtual sex has been prominent in literature, fiction and popular culture, and promoters of these devices have claimed since the 1980s they are the "next big thing" in cybersex technology. At the time Howard Rhinegold started using this term in 1990s, there were already many enthusiasts seeking to explore the power of technology, sex and intimacy. A report in the Chicago Tribune in 1993 suggested that teledildonics was "the virtual-reality technology that may one day allow people wearing special bodysuits, headgear and gloves to engage in tactile sexual relations from separate, remote locations via computers connected to phone lines." It was the same year that the Cyber-SM suit was released by Stahl Stensile, which featured on the cover of FutureSex, a 1990s San Francisco–based magazine that focused on the emergence of teledidlonics. Some products have been shown at the Museum of Sex in New York City and there was an exhibition about Stensile's Cyber-SM suit in 2016.

The responses to teledildonics have been mixed; however, the dominant concern has centered on the separation of personal intimacy and embodied presence. In the words of one early text on the subject:

Controversy 
Many companies experimenting in the field have been hit with patent lawsuits. At the 2016 South by Southwest Festival, virtual reality entrepreneur Ela Darling asserted that patent holders were preventing the production of teledildonic technology.

The Electronic Frontier Foundation has named one such patent the "stupid patent of the month". That patent expired in August 2018, lowering the barrier of entry to the field.

See also

 AEBN
 Arse Elektronika
 Haptic technology
 Lovense
 OhMiBod
 RealTouch
 Sarah Jamie Lewis 
 Sex robot
 Sex-technology
 Slashdong
 Telehaptics

References

External links

 Wired News: Reaching Through the Net to Touch
 Wired News: Ins and Outs of Teledildonics
 Reviews for several interactive sex toys from The Virtual Sex Review

 
American inventions
Vibrators
Machine sex